The 1945 CCNY Beavers football team was an American football team that represented the City College of New York (CCNY) as an independent during the 1945 college football season. In their first season under head coach Louis Gebhard, the team compiled an 0–8 record.

Schedule

References

CCNY
CCNY Beavers football seasons
College football winless seasons
CCNY Beavers football